Angus John Redford (born 16 September 1956) is a former South Australian politician. He was a Liberal Party member of the South Australian Legislative Council between 1993 and 2006.

Wayne Matthew, sitting member for Bright, retired at the 2006 state election. Redford won preselection over party vice-president Dean Hersey. Redford lost with a 34.4% first preference vote, with Labor candidate Chloë Fox winning from a 50.2% first preference vote and a 59.4% two-party vote from a 14.4% two-party swing. He is now a Barrister specialising in Criminal Law.

Redford stood for local government election in the City of Norwood Payneham & St Peters in 2018 but was not elected.

References

External links
 Parliament Profile

1956 births
Living people
Members of the South Australian Legislative Council
Liberal Party of Australia members of the Parliament of South Australia
21st-century Australian politicians